Club Deportivo Vera is a Spanish football team based in Puerto de la Cruz, in the autonomous community of Canary Islands. Founded on 1 January 1936, it plays in Tercera División RFEF – Group 12, holding home matches at Estadio Nuevo Salvador Ledesma, with a capacity of 1,500 people.

Season to season

10 seasons in Tercera División
1 season in Tercera División RFEF

References

External links
Soccerway team profile

Football clubs in the Canary Islands
Association football clubs established in 1936
1936 establishments in Spain